George W. Swarn (born February 15, 1964) is a former American football running back who played in one game during the 1987 season with the Cleveland Browns of the National Football League. He was drafted by the St. Louis Cardinals in the fifth round of the 1987 NFL Draft. He played college football for the Miami Redskins and attended Malabar High School in Mansfield, Ohio.

References

External links
Just Sports Stats
College stats

Living people
1964 births
Players of American football from Cincinnati
American football running backs
African-American players of American football
Miami RedHawks football players
Cleveland Browns players
21st-century African-American people
20th-century African-American sportspeople